For a Living: The Poetry of Work is a literary anthology of American labor poetry written during the 1980s and 1990s.

The book identifies within American literature of the current Information Age or service economy a new work poetry about the nature and culture of nonindustrial work: white collar, pink collar, domestic, clerical, technical, managerial, or professional. The poems cross lines of status, class, and gender and range from mopping floors to television news reporting, Wall Street brokerage, and raising children. The anthology offers nearly two hundred poems by ninety-six poets, most of whom are of the baby boomer generation.

The collection was edited by Nicholas Coles and Peter Oresick, both of the University of Pittsburgh. It is a companion volume to their critically acclaimed Working Classics: Poems on Industrial Life, an anthology of blue-collar work poetry. For a Living remains in print since its first publication in 1995 by the University of Illinois Press.

Selected Poets in For a Living
Ai · Maggie Anderson · John Ashbery · Dorothy Barresi · Jan Beatty · Wanda Coleman · Jim Daniels · Toi Derricotte · Cornelius Eady · Martín Espada · Alice Fulton · Tess Gallagher · Dana Gioia · Albert Goldbarth · Judy Grahn · Edward Hirsch · David Ignatow · Denis Johnson · Lawrence Joseph · Maxine Hong Kingston · Susan Kinsolving · Ted Kooser · Brad Leithauser · Philip Levine · Thomas Lynch · Campbell McGrath · Joyce Carol Oates · Ed Ochester · Sharon Olds · Alicia Ostriker · Louis Simpson · Michelle Tokarczyk · John Updike · Judith Vollmer · Tom Wayman · C. K. Williams

References

External links
 Look inside For a Living at Google Books

1995 poetry books
Working-class literature
American poetry anthologies